Of the 2 Utah incumbents, 1 was re-elected and 1 lost re-election.

See also 
 List of United States representatives from Utah
 United States House of Representatives elections, 1972

1972
Utah
1972 Utah elections